Donald Steven Tamihere (born 1972) is Te Pīhopa o Te Tairāwhiti (Bishop of Te Tairāwhiti). He was ordained as a bishop in March 2017, succeeding Archbishop Brown Turei. Donald is also Bishop of Aotearoa Head of the Maori Anglican Church & Primate & Archbishop of New Zealand as of April 2018

Before his election as bishop, Tamihere was Tumuaki (Dean) of Te Rau College and Ministry Educator for Te Pīhopatanga o Te Tairāwhiti.

Early life

Tamihere was born in Gisborne in 1972 to Don and Catherine Tamihere. His early childhood was spent in Te Puia Springs and Ruatoria, and his teenage years in Tokomaru Bay. At age 12 Tamihere was confirmed by Bishop Peter Atkins at Mangahanea Marae in Ruatoria. He began teaching Bible in Schools at the age of 15. At 19 Tamihere left Tokomaru Bay to study at the Apostolic Church's Te Nikau Bible College in Paraparaumu. In 2001 he graduated from Saint John's Theological College with a master's degree in Theology.

Ordained ministry
Tamihere was deaconed at St Mary's Church, Tikitiki, on 23 March 2003, and priested at Holy Trinity Gisborne on 5 December 2004.

In October 2016, following Brown Turei's resignation as Bishop of Te Tairāwhiti, Tamihere was nominated to succeed Turei at an electoral college held in Toko Toro Tapu church in Manutuke. Tamihere was ordained and installed as second bishop of Tairāwhiti at Porourangi Marae in Ruatoria on 11 March 2017.

Personal life
Tamihere met Temukisa Saifiti while studying at Te Nikau Bible College and they married in 1994. The marriage was officiated by Archdeacon Hone Kaa. Tamihere has three children, Tiana, Danielle and Ethan. Tamihere's two younger brothers are also involved in the Anglican church, the Ven Michael Tamihere succeeded his brother as Dean of Te Rau College, while Andrew is the Diocesan Registrar for Te Pīhopatanga o Te Tairāwhiti.

References

21st-century Anglican bishops in New Zealand
New Zealand Māori people
Primates of New Zealand
Anglican bishops of Aotearoa
1972 births
Living people
21st-century Anglican archbishops in New Zealand
Anglican bishops of Te Tairāwhiti